Catholic Health Australia represents 75 hospitals and 550 residential and community aged care services and comprises Australia's largest non-government not-for-profit grouping of health and aged care services. Catholic Health Australia was established by the Roman Catholic Church in Australia as the representative body of these health and aged care services.

It is the largest grouping of non-government health, aged and community care services in Australia and according to Catholic Health Australia, one in every ten Australians being cared for in hospitals or residing in aged care facilities are in Catholic health care institutions.  Catholic Health Australia says its foundational principles are to service such interests as advocacy and policy development for the "Dignity of the Human Person"; "Service"; the "Common Good"; and "Preference for the Poor and Under-Served".

The group also advocates on behalf of its members to the Australian Governments on health- and aged care-related issues.

See also

Catholic Social Services Australia
Christianity in Australia
Health care in Australia
Catholic Church and health care

References

External links
Official Home Page
Aged Caring

Catholic health care
Health services companies of Australia
Catholic Church in Australia